Ranjit Singh is an Indian Volleyball player who participated in the 3rd All India volleyball tournament in 2016. He was also named Most Valuable Player in Boys' U18 volleyball. He plays for Ahmedabad Defenders in the Pro Volleyball League.

References

Indian men's volleyball players
Living people
Year of birth missing (living people)
Place of birth missing (living people)
Volleyball players at the 2014 Asian Games
Volleyball players at the 2018 Asian Games
Asian Games competitors for India
Volleyball players from Punjab, India